A Book Like This  is the first studio album by Australian singer-songwriter duo Angus & Julia Stone. It was released in September 2007 in Australia and debuted and peaked on the ARIA Charts at number 6.

The album was released in the UK through Flock Music/PIAS on 31 March 2008 and an alternative version was released in North America through Nettwerk on 3 March 2009 where the band performed songs from the album on US Radio Station KCRW .

At the ARIA Music Awards of 2008, the album was nominated for Best Blues and Roots Album, Best Group, Breakthrough Artist and Best Cover Art.

Reception

Andrew Leahey from AllMusic said "Angus & Julia Stone's debut recalls the lush, cuddle-up-in-bed indie folk of the Weepies and Kaiser Cartel. A Book Like This takes strength from its two young songwriters, both of whom approach love and coming-of-age issues from their own gendered perspective. Julia plays the part of the quirky ingénue, her vocals fluttering like a young Joanna Newsom over homespun melodies and gauzy instrumental backdrops... where brother Angus details an awkward encounter with the fairer sex". Leahey concluded "A Book Like This is an appropriate soundtrack for lazy Sunday afternoons and slow Monday mornings, when the pace of the world matches the relaxed gait of this band."

Track listing

Alternative version (2009)

Personnel
 Zach Brock– Strings, Violin
 Ian Burdge– Cello
 Mitchell Connelly– Drums, Percussion
 Calina de la Mare– Violin
 Emery Dobyns– Harmony
 Ali Friend– Bass
 Fran Healy– Bass, Congas, Glockenspiel, Piano 
 Sally Herbert– String Arrangements, Strings, Violin
 Christopher Hoffman– Cello, Strings
 John Metcalfe– Viola
 Elizabeth Myers– Strings, Viola
 Ian Pritchett– Bass 
 Jeff Ratner– Bass, Double Bass
 Angus Stone– Guitar, Guitar (Electric), Harmonica, Vocals
 Julia Stone– Bazouki, Guitar, Organ, Piano, Trumpet, Vocals
 Cameron Whipp– Violin
 Sarah Jane Wilson– Cello

 Producers– Angus & Julia Stone, Fran Healy, Ian Pritchett
 Mixer– Ian Pritchett
 Album Illustrator– Caroline Pedler

Charts

Weekly charts

Year-end charts

Certification

Release history

References

2007 albums
Angus & Julia Stone albums
EMI Records albums
Independiente Records albums